Quentin Maceiras (born 10 October 1995) is a Swiss professional footballer who plays as a defender for Young Boys.

Personal life
Maceiras was born in Switzerland and is of Spanish descent.

Career statistics

Club

References

Swiss men's footballers
Swiss people of Spanish descent
Swiss Super League players
1995 births
Living people
FC Sion players
Association football defenders
People from Sion, Switzerland
Sportspeople from Valais